The following lists events that happened during 1848 in New Zealand.

Population
The estimated population of New Zealand at the end of 1848 is 68,300 Māori and 17,166 non-Māori.

Incumbents

Regal and viceregal
Head of State – Queen Victoria
Governor – Sir George Grey

Government and law
Chief Justice — William Martin
Lieutenant Governor, New Munster — From 28 January, Edward John Eyre
Lieutenant Governor, New Ulster — From 14 February, George Dean Pitt

Events 
23 March: The founding of the city of Dunedin and Otago Province, with the arrival of the John Wickliffe, carrying Scottish settlers, at Port Chalmers.
23 June: Government House, in Auckland is burned to the ground by a fire believed to have started in the butler's pantry. Most chattels and Government documents were saved.
17 September – The first attempt at photography is made in New Zealand.  Lieutenant-Governor Eyre is unsuccessful in his attempt to take a daguerreotype of Eliza Grey, wife of Governor Grey.
13 December – Otago News begins publication. The newspaper publishes fortnightly until closing in 1850.

Sport

Cricket
Cricket is played on the present site of The Octagon, Dunedin. A team from Otago challenges Wellington to a match, but the challenge is not accepted. (see 1860 for the first inter-provincial game)

Births

 29 April: David Buick, politician.
 26 August: Sarah Ann McMurray, woodcarver
 2 October: (in India) G. M. Thomson, scientist

Deaths
 17 June: Joseph Burns, murderer.
 19 September: William Wakefield, founder of Wellington.
 22 September (in Berbice, British Guiana): Samuel Martin, land claimant, magistrate, journalist and writer.

See also
List of years in New Zealand
Timeline of New Zealand history
History of New Zealand
Military history of New Zealand
Timeline of the New Zealand environment
Timeline of New Zealand's links with Antarctica

References